"Save Yourself" is a song by American industrial rock band Stabbing Westward. The song was released as the second single from the band's 1998 album Darkest Days. The track is one of the band's most known songs.

Background

In a 2020 interview with Songfacts, lead singer Christopher Hall said:

Music video
The song's music video shows the band performing the song in a rundown house inhabited by strange people.

Track listing
Promo single

EP single

Appearances in other media
 The song was featured in the trailers for the films The Mod Squad and Fatal Error in 1999, and The Covenant in 2006.
 The song was featured on the soundtracks for Tekken: The Motion Picture in 1998 and Shaun White Snowboarding in 2008.
 The song played during the end credits to the True Blood Season 5 finale of the same name.
 The song was featured in the 1998 film Urban Legend.

Chart positions

Personnel
 Christopher Hall – vocals, guitar
 Marcus Eliopulos – guitar
 Jim Sellers – bass
 Walter Flakus – keyboards
 Andy Kubiszewski – drums

References

1998 singles
Stabbing Westward songs
Columbia Records singles
1998 songs
Nu metal songs
Songs written by Andy Kubiszewski
Songs written by Christopher Hall (musician)